U.S. Highway 96 (US 96) is a north–south United States Numbered Highway that runs for about  entirely in the U.S state of Texas. Its number is a violation of the standard numbering convention, as even-numbered two-digit highways are east–west routes by rule. As of 2004, the highway's southern terminus (as well as those of US 287 and US 69) is in Port Arthur at an intersection with State Highway 87 (SH 87). Its northern terminus is in Tenaha at an intersection with US 59 (Future Interstate 69 [I-69])/(Future I-369) and US 84 (Future I-69).

U.S. Highway 96 is designated by the State of Texas as a major hurricane evacuation route, with the local county governments facilitating the evacuation of citizens along U.S. Highway 96 from Coastal Region counties, including but not limited to, Harris County, Galveston County, Brazoria County, Chambers County, Jefferson County, Orange County, Hardin County, Jasper County, Newton County and Tyler County.

U.S. Highway 96 has been utilized many times in the past for hurricane evacuations, with the most recent being Hurricane Rita in 2005, Hurricane Gustav in 2008, Hurricane Ike in 2008, and Hurricane Laura in 2020. During Hurricane Katrina in 2005, U.S. Highway 96 was also utilized to route evacuees from Louisiana, who had fled west out of the hurricane's path.  This designated hurricane evacuation route is utilized to evacuate citizens to the north into North and Northeast Texas, Northwest Louisiana, Arkansas and Oklahoma, out of the range of a hurricane's deadly winds, tornadoes, flooding and storm surge.

U.S. Highway 96 also serves as a major Strategic Military Highway, connecting Fort Polk in Leesville, Louisiana and the Red River Army Depot near Texarkana, Texas to the Port of Beaumont in Beaumont, Texas.  This Strategic Military Highway is utilized regularly by the Department of Defense for transporting military personnel, materials, equipment and vehicles to and from the Port of Beaumont in support of military deployments and operations overseas, as well as the national defense mission here in the United States.

Additionally, U.S. Highway 96 is a major highway utilized for transporting citizens, goods and services to and from four Texas ports, including Beaumont, Port Arthur and Orange, as well as Intersecting Interstate 10, which connects U.S. Highway 96 to the Port of Houston.

Plans to upgrade the existing connecting route of U.S. Highway 190 to Interstate 14 and U.S. Highway 59 to Interstate 69 will increase the connectivity of U.S. Highway 96 for strategic military transport, commercial and travel purposes, connecting this artery to three major Interstate Highway Corridors, including I-10, I-14 and I-69/U.S. 59.

U.S. Highway 96 is also the primary transportation route from the Texas Coastal Region to access Lake Sam Rayburn and Lake B.A. Steinhagen, the Neches and Angelina Rivers, the Angelina National Forest, the Masterson State Forest (Established 1985) in Buna, Texas and the Daughters of the American Revolution State Forest (Established 1929) in Cairo Springs, Texas.

Route description
US 96 begins at SH 87 in Port Arthur, at a southern terminus it also shares with US 69 and US 287. The three highways head in a northwest direction toward Beaumont. In Beaumont, the three highways briefly merge with Interstate 10 (I-10), but then split from that freeway continuing northwest. In Lumberton, US 96 separates from US 287 and US 69, and heads northeast towards Silsbee. In Silsbee, US 96 splits with US 96F, (A special route of US 96 that serves downtown Silsbee.) while being routed on a bypass freeway. After Silsbee, US 96 heads northeast to Buna, then north to Kirksville and Jasper. After Jasper. US 96 comes near the Sam Rayburn Reservoir near Pineland. US 96 eventually comes to its northern terminus near Tenaha at a junction with US 59 (Future I-69)/(Future I-369) and US 84 (Future I-69).

History

In 1927 US 96 was originally  routed: Beginning at Rosenburg via Wharton, Victoria, Beeville, Skidmore, Alice, Falfurrias, San Juan to Brownsville.

In 1933, the present route of US 96 was originally proposed to be part of US 71.  Under this plan, discussed at a meeting of the United States Good Roads Association in Beaumont, US 71 was to be diverted out of Louisiana altogether and instead re-routed from the Texarkana area southward through East Texas.

In 1935, US 96 was rerouted to Laredo instead of Brownsville. 03/01/1935 - Beginning at Rosenburg, Wharton, Victoria, Beeville, Skidmore, Mathis, Alice, Laredo. This is the current route of US 59.

In the 1935, US 59 was initially routed from Teneha to Port Arthur following the basic route of the current US 96. US 96 began in Rosenburg (Near Houston) and roughly followed the current route of US 59 to Alice then on to Brownsville and later was rerouted to Laredo.

Minute Order 016701, dated 09/26/1939  radically re-aligned US 96 to travel a route formerly used by US 59:   From Tenaha via Center, San Augustine, Jasper, Buna, Voth, and Beaumont to Port Arthur. (Shelby, San Augustine, Sabine, Jasper, Hardin, and Jefferson Counties)  This renumbered US 59 and 96 beginning in Teneha to roughly their current paths. SH 35 from Teneha to Houston had become US 59. The entirety of the pre-1939 US 96 had been changed to US 59 and US 59 South of Teneha had been renumbered to US 96.

Major intersections

Business routes

Buna business highway

Business U.S. Highway 96-E (US 96 Bus.) is a  spur of US 96 in the Jasper County census designated place of Buna. The highway was designated on September 25, 1939 as Texas State Highway Loop 68, going from US 59 through Buna to US 59. On January 18, 1955, Loop 68 became Texas State Highway Spur 68, and the route was moved to the current route. On June 21, 1990, the designation was changed to Business US 96-E, and a concurrency with SH 62 was added.
 It begins southwest of the community at US 96 and travels northeast paralleling a railroad. Except for one small industry, the highway travels past residential areas before it ends at SH 62 in the center of Buna. A left turn onto SH 62 can be made to access US 96 again.

Silsbee business highway

Business U.S. Highway 96-F (US 96 Bus.) is a  business loop of US 96 serving the Hardin County city of Silsbee. The highway begins at an interchange with US 96 south of the city and travels north to the city limits as a four-lane undivided road. Upon reaching the Silsbee city limits, the name of the road also becomes 5th Street. In the center of the city, US 96 Bus. reaches Avenue N which carries SH 327. At Avenue G, US 96 Bus. turns right while FM 92 continues north through the city. FM 418's eastern terminus occurs at a stop-controlled T intersection east of the city center. At the highway's northern intersection with US 96, US 96 Bus. briefly runs on two frontage roads on either side of US 96 before it terminates at right-in/right-out intersections with the divided US 96.

The route was originally designated on Texas State Highway Loop 498 on November 30, 1978. The route was changed to Business US 96-F on June 21, 1990. 

The number was originally used for Texas State Highway Spur 498, designated on April 29, 1971 from SH 146 to Spur 501 in LaPorte via Wharton Weems Blvd. This was cancelled on July 28, 1977 and mileage was transferred to rerouted Loop 410 (not to be confused with I-410), whose alignment on Fairmont Parkway was cancelled and given to the city of LaPorte. Loop 410 was marked as Business SH 146, and became Business SH 146-D on June 21, 1990. Note that the sections of Business SH 146-D on Broadway Street and Main Street were cancelled on March 26, 2009 and given to the city of LaPorte.

See also

References

External links

Endpoints of U.S. Highway 96

96
96
Transportation in Jefferson County, Texas
Transportation in Hardin County, Texas
Transportation in Jasper County, Texas
Transportation in Sabine County, Texas
Transportation in San Augustine County, Texas
Transportation in Shelby County, Texas